This is a list of wars involving the Republic of Finland. The combat in Finland from 1939 through 1945 is considered part of the Second World War.

List

See also
 Military of the Grand Duchy of Finland
 Military history of Finland
 List of Finnish treaties
 Early Finnish wars
 History of Finland
 List of Swedish wars
 Finland Guard Regiment

References

Citations

Bibliography
 

Finland
 
Wars
Wars